François Morren (16 April 1899 – 9 December 1985) was a Belgian sprinter. He competed in the men's 400 metres at the 1920 Summer Olympics.

References

1899 births
1985 deaths
Athletes (track and field) at the 1920 Summer Olympics
Athletes (track and field) at the 1924 Summer Olympics
Belgian male sprinters
Belgian male middle-distance runners
Olympic athletes of Belgium
Place of birth missing